Bruhathkayosaurus (meaning "huge-bodied lizard") is an extinct genus of sauropod dinosaur found in the Kallamedu Formation of India. The fragmentary remains were originally described as a theropod, but it was later determined to be a titanosaurian sauropod. All of the estimates are based on the dimensions of the fossils described in Yadagiri and Ayyasami (1987), which announced the find. In 2017, it was reported that the holotype fossils had disintegrated and no longer exist.

Discovery and naming 

The holotype of Bruhathkayosaurus, GSI PAL/SR/20, was discovered around 1978 near the southern tip of India, specifically in the Tiruchirappalli district of Tamil Nadu, northeast of Kallamedu village. It was recovered from rocks of the Kallamedu Formation, which are dated to the Maastrichtian stage of the Late Cretaceous, about 70 million years ago. The fossilized remains include hip bones (the ilium and ischium), partial leg bones (femur and tibia), a forearm (radius) and a tail bone (part of a vertebra, specifically a platycoelous caudal centrum). The remains were originally classified as belonging to a carnosaurian theropod by Yadagiri and Ayyasami in 1987 (not 1989, as some sources indicate). The generic name chosen, "Bruhathkayosaurus", is derived from a combination of the Sanskrit word Bruhathkaya (bṛhat , 'huge, heavy' and kāya, काय 'body'), and the Greek sauros (lizard). The specific epithet, "matleyi", honours British palaeontologist Charles Alfred Matley, who discovered many fossils in India.

The monsoon season, combined with the sands and clays of the Kallamedu Formation, creates water-saturated fossils which are very friable. During the dry season, expansion during the day and contraction during the night can cause fossils to split apart. This results in poorly preserved bones that can be impossible to extract without damage. In 2017, Galton and Ayyasami reported that the Bruhathkayosaurus fossils started to disintegrate inside their field jackets before reaching the Geological Survey of India (GSI) and no longer exist.

Classification 

Bruhathkayosaurus was originally classified as a carnosaur (like Allosaurus), of an uncertain position (incertae sedis). However, Chatterjee (1995) re-examined the remains and demonstrated that Bruhathkayosaurus is actually a titanosaur sauropod. Some later studies listed Bruhathkayosaurus as an indeterminate sauropod or as a nomen dubium.

The original publication described little in the way of diagnostic characteristics and was only supported by a few line drawings and photographs of the fossils as they lay in the ground. This led to online speculation by researchers that the bones might actually have been petrified wood, akin to the way the original discoverers of Sauroposeidon initially believed their find to be fossilized tree trunks,. However, a 2022 review by Pal and Ayyasami suggested that the skeleton was real and that the genus is likely valid. Additional previously unseen photographs were provided of the tibia bone at the excavation site and in a plaster jacket. Pal and Ayyasami also reinforced the taxon's position within Titanosauria.

The only known remains of Bruhathkayosaurus have been lost so the validity of the genus and any size estimates are questionable.

Size estimates 
The fragmentary femur was similarly huge; across the distal end, it measured , 33% larger than the femur of Antarctosaurus giganteus, which measures . The ilium measured  in length. 

No total body size estimates for Bruhathkayosaurus have been published, but paleontologists and researchers have posted tentative estimates on the Internet. In 2019, Gregory S. Paul suggested that the supposed tibia was probably a degraded femur, in which case its length was slightly greater than that of Dreadnoughtus (1.91 meters) and Futalognkosaurus (1.98 meters). Its ilium is similar in length to that of Dreadnoughtus whereas the width of the distal femur appears to slightly exceed that of Patagotitan.

By comparison, the titanosaur Argentinosaurus is estimated to have reached  in length, and to have weighed 65–100 tonnes. These sauropods are known only from partial or fragmentary remains, so the size estimates are uncertain. Length is calculated by comparing existing bones to the bones of similar dinosaurs, which are known from more complete skeletons and scaling them up isometrically. However, such extrapolation can never be more than an educated guess and the length of the tail, in particular, is often hard to judge. Determining mass is even more difficult because little evidence of soft tissues survives in the fossil record. In addition, isometric scaling is based on the assumption that body proportions remain the same, which is not necessarily the case. In particular, the proportions of the titanosaurs are not well known, due to a limited number of relatively complete specimens.

If the upper size estimates for Bruhathkayosaurus are accurate, it would be similar in size to the blue whale.

Another poorly known sauropod that shares similar size estimates to Bruhathkayosaurus is Maraapunisaurus fragillimus, which is based on a now-missing dorsal vertebra. In 2018, however, Carpenter estimated Maraapunisaurus to be  in length based upon comparisons with rebbachisaurids.

See also 
 Largest prehistoric animals
 Dinosaur size
 Breviparopus
 Patagotitan

References

External links 
 Report on the initial description from the Dinosaur Mailing List

Titanosaurs
Maastrichtian life
Late Cretaceous dinosaurs
Dinosaurs of India and Madagascar 
Fossils of India
Fossil taxa described in 1987
Controversial dinosaur taxa